Barbara J. Minshall (born November 6, 1953) is a Canadian Thoroughbred racehorse trainer and owner who has competed both in Canada and the United States. She is the widow of Canadian Horse Racing Hall of Fame inductee Aubrey W. Minshall, the successful breeder and owner of the  Minshall Farms near Hillsburgh, Ontario. Following her husband's death in 1993, Barbara Minshall, having been involved in the operation of the farm, continued the business and became a licensed trainer in 1999.

Born in Montreal, Quebec, Ms. Minshall was raised around horses and as a young lady rode jumpers and qualified for the Canadian dressage team for the Summer Olympics and the Pan-American Games. In her first year as a trainer in Thoroughbred racing, Barbara Minshall became the first woman to train the winner of a Canadian Triple Crown race when the Minshall Farms colt Kiridashi won the Prince of Wales Stakes at Fort Erie Racetrack. She followed that up by being voted the 1996 Sovereign Award as Canada's outstanding trainer and her Minshall Farms won the Sovereign Award for Outstanding Breeder and Outstanding Owner.

Among her other top horses have been Mt. Sassafras, Bold Ruritana, and Stephanotis. Mt. Sassafras was the 1996 Canadian Horse of the Year and Canadian Champion Older Male Horse. On March 29, 2021,  Mt. Sassafras was one of three horses named as a finalist for induction in the Canadian Horse Racing Hall of Fame in its Thoroughbred Veteran Category.

References

1953 births
Living people
Canadian racehorse trainers
Canadian racehorse owners and breeders
Sportspeople from Montreal